Russia competed at the 2013 World Championships in Athletics from August 10 to August 18 in Moscow, Russia as the host nation.

Medalists 
The following competitors from Russia won medals at the Championships (see below):

Results

Men
Track & road events

Field events

Combined events – Decathlon

Women
Track & road events

Field events

Combined events – Heptathlon

External links
 Athletes list

Russia
World Championships in Athletics
2013